Étoile Sportive Madinet Koléa, known as ESM Koléa or simply ESMK for short, is an Algerian football club located in Koléa, Algeria. The club was founded in 1946 and its colours are green and red. Their home stadium, Complexe sportif Omnisports de Kolea, has a capacity of 16,000 spectators. The club is currently playing in the Ligue Nationale du Football Amateur.

References

Football clubs in Algeria
Association football clubs established in 1946
1946 establishments in Algeria
Sports clubs in Algeria